The Tunnell–West House is a historic house at 39 Central Avenue in Ocean View, Delaware.  The -story wood-frame house was built sometime between 1868 and 1890, and is a distinctive local example of vernacular Gothic Revival style.  Elements of the building's interior are particularly well preserved, including door hardware and trim elements.  The local historical society is adapting the house for use as a museum.

The house was listed on the National Register of Historic Places in 2012.

See also
National Register of Historic Places listings in Sussex County, Delaware

References

External links
Ocean View Historical Society Projects

Houses on the National Register of Historic Places in Delaware
Gothic Revival architecture in Delaware
Houses completed in 1868
Houses in Sussex County, Delaware
National Register of Historic Places in Sussex County, Delaware